Ida Jenbach was an Austrian playwright and screenwriter for German and Austrian cinema during the 1920s. She was one of the authors of the spirited farce Opera Ball that appeared at the Little Carnegie Playhouse in New York City in 1931. New York Times critic Mordaunt Hall praised this comedy as “cleverly acted by the principals.”  The Opera Ball (Opernredoute) was a German film that had “captions in English lettered on the scenes to keep those unfamiliar with German au courant of what is happening.”

In 1926, Jenbach wrote the script to The Priest from Kirchfeld, based on Ludwig Anzengruber‘s popular German "folk play". The play bears a notable resemblance to The Atonement of Gosta Berling. Attacking the Catholic doctrine of celibacy for priests and the denial of burial for suicides, the play was and remains very controversial.

Jenbach also worked on the screenplay to Hugo Bettauer’s 1924 dystopian satire, Die Stadt ohne Juden ("The City without Jews").  This novel was prescient. It imagined a city that expelled the Jews and confiscated their wealth. It was meant to show the ridiculousness of anti-Semitism. It was Bettauer’s most famous and best selling novel, and was translated into numerous languages. It was also his undoing. The novel angered the Nazis. A year later, Nazi party member Otto Rothstock murdered Bettauer. When the film version opened, members of the National Socialist party tossed stink bombs into the cinemas, and cinema owners often cut parts of the film out. This film was the first important role for German film star Hans Moser. In 1933, some in the German press said that this film speaks for itself as an indictment against Hitler.

During the Third Reich, Jenbach was sent to the Minsk Ghetto. She died either there or in a concentration camp nearby. Her date of death is unknown.

Selected filmography
 Else of Erlenhof (1919)
 Oh, Dear Augustine (1922)
 Sons in Law (1926)
 The Priest from Kirchfeld (1926)
 The Field Marshal (1927)
 The Family without Morals (1927)
 The Opera Ball (1931)
 When the Soldiers (1931)

References

External links 
Ida Jenbach  at Women Film Pioneers Project

1868 births
1940s deaths
People from Miskolc
Hungarian Jews
Austrian people of Hungarian-Jewish descent
Austrian women dramatists and playwrights
Hungarian women dramatists and playwrights
Austrian civilians killed in World War II
20th-century Hungarian women writers
20th-century Austrian women writers
Jewish Austrian comedians
Women film pioneers
20th-century Hungarian dramatists and playwrights
20th-century Austrian dramatists and playwrights
Minsk Ghetto inmates
Austrian Jews who died in the Holocaust
Hungarian Jews who died in the Holocaust
People who died in ghettos in Nazi-occupied Europe